Taraf may refer to:

Taraf, a Turkish newspaper
Taraf (musical band), a type of folk music band in Romania and Moldova
Taraf, Iran, a village in East Azerbaijan Province, Iran
Taraf, Kerman, a village in Kerman Province, Iran
Taraf (subdivision), an lesser administrative subdivision used in the Indian subcontinent
Taraf Kingdom, medieval kingdom in northeastern Bangladesh
Taraf TV, a Romanian TV channel
Taraf string, a sympathetic string in some musical instruments
Lagonda Taraf, a British car